Ivanilton de Souza Lima (born March 9, 1950 in Recife, Brazil), known by his stage name Michael Sullivan, is a Brazilian singer-songwriter, lyricist and guitarist. Brazilian composer, singer, musician, and producer Michael Sullivan is considered the most prolific and successful Brazilian songwriter of all time, with more than 2000 recorded songs by Brazilian, Hispanic and Global artists, released in 60 markets in Latin and North Americas, Europe, Asia and Middle East regions. Throughout his career, Sullivan has performed in successful groups and as a solo artist in multiple genres from ballads to gospel and has sold 60 million albums and received 60 Diamond, 270 Platinum and 550 Gold awards, inducted into the Latin Songwriters Hall Of Fame at the 7th annual La Musa Awards.

Michael Sullivan started his solo career singing in English with the song My Life (his second composition),  The compact My Life became one of the best sellers in Brazil for the phonographic market, surpassing the mark of 1,000,000 copies, which was equivalent to a Diamond Record.

Discography

Singles and EPs (in English) 

 1976 - My Life
 1977 - Sorrow / Please, Please

Singles and EPs 

 1978 - Um Mundo Melhor Pro Meu Filho
 1978 - Un Mundo Mejor Para Mi Hijo Tuve Miedo De Amar
 1980 - Michael Sullivan
 1980 - Vou Fazer Você Mulher

Albums 

 1978 - Sou Brasileiro 
 1979 - Michael Sullivan 
 1992 - Talismã
 1995 - Amar É Lindo 
 2005 - Duetos
 2010 - Na Linha Do Tempo Ao Vivo (Volume 1)
 2010 - Na Linha Do Tempo Ao Vivo (Volume 2)

References

External Links

 Official Site

 Michael Sullivan - Discogs

 https://www.latinsonghall.com/latin-songwriters-hall-of-fame-announces-2019-inductees-ivy-queen-willie-colon-michael-sullivan-chico-novarro-armando-larrinaga-to-be-honored-at-la-musa-awards-in-miami/

 Biography

1950 births
Living people
Brazilian singer-songwriters
English-language singers from Brazil
People from Recife
Brazilian lyricists
Brazilian guitarists
Brazilian male guitarists
Brazilian male singer-songwriters